Iwona Maria Blazwick OBE (born 14 October 1955) is a British art critic and lecturer. She is currently the Chair of the Royal Commission for Al-'Ula’s Public Art Expert Panel.  She was the Director of the Whitechapel Art Gallery in London from 2001 to 2022. She discovered Damien Hirst and staged his first solo show at a public London art gallery, Institute of Contemporary Arts in 1992. She supports the careers of young artists. 

Blazwick was appointed Officer of the Order of the British Empire (OBE) for services to art in 2008. She is married to Richard Noble, the Canadian philosopher and fine art lecturer at Goldsmiths University of London.

Early life
Blazwick was brought up in Blackheath, South East London. She is the child of Polish architects who both painted and inspired her passion for art and design. Her family name is Błaszczyk, but she later changed the spelling as she found people could not pronounce it or misspelled it.

Education and early career 
Blazwick studied English and Fine Art at Exeter University. She wrote her university thesis on Henry Moore. After university, she was hired as a receptionist for a pop art prints and books publisher. She became an assistant curator at the Institute of Contemporary Arts, under the tutelage of Sandy Nairne, who is a former director of the National Portrait Gallery. Her first exhibition was, Objects and Sculpture (1981), which included work by artists Bill Woodrow, Richard Deacon, Anish Kapoor and Antony Gormley.

Career
From 1984 to 1986, Blazwick was Director of AIR Gallery, London. From 1986 to 1993, she was Director of Exhibitions at the Institute of Contemporary Arts, London, where she curated exhibitions of modern and contemporary art.

From 1993 to 1997, Blazwick was a commissioning editor for contemporary art at Phaidon. She also worked as an independent curator for museums and major public arts projects in Europe and Japan, devising surveys of contemporary artists and commissioning new works of art.

From 1997 to 2001, Blazwick was Curator and then Head of Exhibitions at Tate Modern. There she co-conceived a new model for the display of the Collection and a blueprint for the Museum's future program, including the Turbine Hall commissions. She co-curated the inaugural display and the groundbreaking exhibition 'Century City.' Blazwick was responsible for Tate Modern's permanent collection becoming grouped thematically, rather than chronologically.

Since 2001, Blazwick has been the Director of the Whitechapel Gallery, London. She is series editor of Whitechapel Gallery/ MIT Documents of Contemporary Art. Blazwick is Chair of the Cultural Strategy Group at London's City Hall, appointed by Mayor Boris Johnson.

Blazwick was appointed Officer of the Order of the British Empire (OBE) for services to art in the 2008 New Year Honours. She is a Fellow of the Royal College of Art (2004) and has received Honorary Doctorates from Plymouth University (2006), the London Metropolitan University (2007), Goldsmiths' College (2010), the University of the Arts (2011) and Middlesex University. She has sat on the selection panel of the Sky Academy Arts Scholarship. She has been called "one of the most important woman in British art".

In 2022 Iwona Blazwick announced she was stepping down as director of the Whitechapel Gallery in London after two decades. She remained emeritus curator until 2023.

Since June 2022 she is the Chair of the Royal Commission for Al-'Ula’s Public Art Expert Panel, overseeing the large-scale, site-specific commissions planned for the Wadi AlFann area located in the vast northwest region of the archaeological and historical site.

Writing
Blazwick has written monographs and articles on many contemporary artists and published extensively on themes and movements in modern and contemporary art, exhibition histories and art institutions. Her writings include monographs on Gary Hume (Other Criteria, 2012) and Cornelia Parker (Thames and Hudson, 2013); and contributions to monographs and exhibition catalogues on Hannah Collins, Keith Coventry, Elmgreen and Dragset, Fischli and Weiss, Ceal Floyer, Katharina Fritsch, Roni Horn, Ilya Kabakov, Alex Katz, Paul McCarthy, Cornelia Parker, Annie Ratti, Hannah Starkey, Lawrence Weiner and Rachel Whiteread; and anthologies including Fresh Cream in 2001. She was editor of the Tate Modern: The Handbook and Century City. She also writes art criticism for numerous periodicals. She contributes occasional reviews and commentaries for BBC and Channel Four television and BBC radio. She also wrote the introduction for Talking Art: Interviews with Artists Since 1976, published by Ridinghouse and Art Monthly and featuring the best interviews from the latter's 30-year run. Blazwick is series editor of Documents of Contemporary Art; co-published with MIT Press these anthologies bring together the most important texts by artists, critics and historians on the big themes in art today, ranging from Participation to Failure.

Blazwick has sat on several art prize juries, including the Turner Prize (1993), the Jerwood Painting Prize (1997), the 2002 Wexner Prize (as a member of Ohio's Wexner Center's International Arts Advisory Council), the Clark Prize for Writing (2010/12) and the John Moores Painting Prize (2012). She is chair of the MaxMara Art Prize for Women and a standing member of the jury for Film London's Jarman Award; and a member of the Fourth Plinth Committee.

Blazwick is a Trustee of Harewood House in Yorkshire; and serves on the Advisory Boards of the Government Art Collection; the Paul Mellon Centre for British Art; Sculpture in the City; and the Trafalgar Square Fourth Plinth Commission. She was on the Advisory Board of Documenta 13, jury for the 2015, 2017, 2019, 2021 Istanbul Biennale, and board of the MAXXI Museum in Rome.

References

External links
 Whitechapel Gallery website
Art in public space: Iwona Blazwick at TedxAthens 2013
Interview with Iwona Blazwick and Diane Howse
John Moores Painting Prize
 "Vitamin P3: New Perspectives in Painting." Phaidon Press, 2017. 
 Ocula Conversation: A conversation with Iwona Blazwick

1955 births
English people of Polish descent
Living people
Officers of the Order of the British Empire
People from Blackheath, London
British art critics
Chevaliers of the Ordre des Arts et des Lettres
English curators
British curators
Art museum people